Rupa and the April Fishes is a global alternative group based in San Francisco, California, fronted by composer, singer and guitarist Rupa Marya. The group's songs are a mixture of musical styles ranging from jazz to punk to reggae to chanson, with lyrics in multiple languages (primarily French, Spanish and English).

The group began as a duet between Rupa Marya and cellist Ed Baskerville, and then grew to a band in San Francisco.

The name derives from the French saying "poisson d'avril [fr]", which means "April Fools'".

The group was featured on BBC World Service's and Public Radio Internationals The World.

The group has toured around the world and played at WOMAD, the Sziget Festival, Montreal Jazz Festival, Central Park Summerstage, Chicago Millennium Park, Sierra Nevada World Music Festival, Rajasthan International Folk Festival, and the Mosaic Music Festival.

Discography
La Pêcheuse EP (2006)
eXtraOrdinary rendition (Cumbancha, 2008). The title refers to the US policy of Extraordinary Rendition.
Este mundo (Cumbancha, 2009): The means 'this world'. Guests include Boots Riley and Djordje Stijepovic
Build (Electric Gumbo Radio Music, 2012)
LIVE at the Independent (Electric Gumbo Radio Music, 2014)
OVAL (Electric Gumbo Radio Music), 2015)

Gallery

References

External links
Official website
Facebook page

Musical groups from San Francisco